Hypochaeris robertia is a Mediterranean species of plants in the tribe Cichorieae within the family Asteraceae. It flowers from spring to autumn.

References

robertia
Plants described in 1845